Mewar is a region in Rajasthan, India.

Mewar may also refer to:

 Udaipur State, also known as Mewar Kingdom, a princely state of India during the British Raj
 Arvind Singh Mewar (born 1944), the 76th custodian of the Mewar dynasty
 Mahendra Singh Mewar (born 1941), Indian politician

See also 
 Marwar, a different region of Rajasthan
 Mewar Residency, a political office during the British Raj